Sonadora may refer to:

Places
Sonadora, Aguas Buenas, Puerto Rico, a barrio
Sonadora, Guaynabo, Puerto Rico, a barrio